Battista Recrosio (2 March 1901 – 30 April 1945) was an Italian racing cyclist. He rode in the 1926 Tour de France.

References

1901 births
1945 deaths
Italian male cyclists
Place of birth missing